Main Tulsi Tere Aangan Ki is a 1978 Indian drama film directed by Raj Khosla and Sudesh Issar.  It is based on a Marathi novel titled Ashi Tujhi Preet by Chandrakant Kakodkar. The film won Nutan her 5th and final Filmfare Award in the Best Actress category for which she held a record of most wins for more than 30 years. It was a "Super Hit" at the box office.

Plot 
Main Tulsi Tere Aangan Ki is about an aristocrat, Thakur Rajnath Singh Chouhan, who is in love with his mistress Tulsi but forced to marry a strong aristocratic woman named Sanjukta. Tulsi sacrifices her life, some time after giving birth to Rajnath's son Ajay, because she wants Sanjukta to have her husband all to herself. Rajnath and Sanjukta send Ajay to boarding school to prevent him from bearing the stigma of being an illegitimate child. Sanjukta and Rajnath have a son, Pratap. Rajnath dies in a horse-riding accident. Sanjukta makes regular visits to the boarding school to see Ajay and, when he grows up, she brings him home. Ajay meets Naini and fall's in love with her after a few misadventures. Sanjukta makes Ajay into not only a very important man but also shields him every time and finally confesses before the public that Ajay is her husband's first son and therefore, is entitled to respect. However, her own son Pratap feels slighted and becomes wayward. Some people around them also try to further damage the relations between the two brothers. However, for every sin of the younger brother, Ajay protects him and takes the blame. Sanjukta, not knowing the actual situation, gets disturbed. Pratap seduces Geeta and gets her pregnant and blames Ajay vide her father Rana. At one stage, she blames Ajay for every wrong thing which actually has been done by her own son. Ajay leaves the house. But soon thereafter, the situation changes as Rana standing in support of Pratap feel deceived as he lets him down refusing to accept his daughter. In the climax, these men try to kill Pratap in a polo match, but Ajay, who learns of this plan, rescues his brother. Then, Pratap realizes his half-brother's kindness. He surrenders to Ajay and accepts him as the elder brother. The family reunites.

Cast 
 Nutan as Sanjukta Chouhan
 Vinod Khanna as Ajay Chouhan
 Asha Parekh as Tulsi 
 Vijay Anand as Thakur Rajnath Singh Chouhan
 Deb Mukherjee as Pratap Chouhan
 Neeta Mehta as Naini
 Jagdish Raj as Agarwal
 Chandrashekhar Dubey as Subramaniam (Accountant)
 Purnima as Rajnath's mother
 Geeta  Bhel as Geeta
 Trilok Kapoor
 Asit Sen as Naini's father
 Bhagwan as Bhimsingh (Naini's servant)
 Goga Kapoor as Thakur Ajmer Singh
 Hina Kausar as courtesan
 Praveen Paul as Leelabai

Soundtrack
The music is composed by Laxmikant-Pyarelal and lyrics are by Anand Bakshi.

Awards

 26th Filmfare Awards:

Won

 Best Film – Raj Khosla
 Best Actress – Nutan
 Best Dialogue – Rahi Masoom Raza

Nominated

 Best Director – Raj Khosla
 Best Supporting Actress – Asha Parekh
 Best Supporting Actress – Nutan
 Best Lyricist – Anand Bakshi for "Main Tulsi Tere Aangan Ki"
 Best Female Playback Singer — Shobha Gurtu for "Saiyan Rooth Gaye"
 Best Story – Chandrakant Kakodkar

Reception
The film became a success at the box office.

The title song sung by Lata Mangeshkar became an instant classic.

References

External links 
 

1978 films
1970s Hindi-language films
Films directed by Raj Khosla
Films scored by Laxmikant–Pyarelal
Films based on Indian novels
Hindi films remade in other languages